Briarwood is a home rule-class city in Jefferson County, Kentucky, United States. The population was 435 at the 2010 census, down from 554 at the 2000 census.

Geography
Briarwood is located in northeastern Jefferson County at  (38.278337, -85.591548). It is bordered by Plantation to the north, Lyndon to the south and west, and by portions of Louisville to the east and northwest.

Demographics

As of the census of 2000, there were 554 people, 272 households, and 136 families residing in the city. The racial makeup of the city was 91.16% White, 6.32% Black or African American, 0.54% Asian, 0.90% from other races, and 1.08% from two or more races. Hispanic or Latino of any race were 1.08% of the population.

There were 272 households, out of which 16.5% had children under the age of 18 living with them, 35.3% were married couples living together, 12.9% had a female householder with no husband present, and 50.0% were non-families. Of all households 46.0% were made up of individuals, and 21.3% had someone living alone who was 65 years of age or older. The average household size was 1.90 and the average family size was 2.65.

In the city, the population was spread out, with 14.6% under the age of 18, 6.9% from 18 to 24, 26.5% from 25 to 44, 28.0% from 45 to 64, and 24.0% who were 65 years of age or older. The median age was 46 years. For every 100 females, there were 67.9 males. For every 100 females age 18 and over, there were 65.4 males.

The median income for a household in the city was $47,500, and the median income for a family was $50,000. Males had a median income of $41,750 versus $30,625 for females. The per capita income for the city was $25,196. About 7.1% of families and 4.4% of the population were below the poverty line, including 8.9% of those under age 18 and 1.9% of those age 65 or over.

References

External links
City of Briarwood official website

Cities in Jefferson County, Kentucky
Cities in Kentucky
Louisville metropolitan area